John Dart (died 1730) was an English lawyer and cleric, known as an antiquary and man of letters.

Life
Initially an attorney, but not successful in the profession, Dart  obtained a title for holy orders. In 1728, he was presented by the master of St. Cross Hospital, Winchester, to the perpetual curacy of Yateley, Hampshire. He served the church from the neighbouring village of Sandhurst, Berkshire, where he died in December 1730, and was buried on the 20th at Yateley.

Works
Dart wrote:

 A modernised version of The Complaint of the Black Knight, London, 1718; it was at that time incorrectly attributed to Geoffrey Chaucer.
 A Life of Chaucer prefixed to John Urry's edition,  London, 1721.
 A paraphrase of Tibullus, London, 1720. 
 Westminster Abbey, a poem, London, 1721, later included in his Westmonasterium.
 History and Antiquities of the Cathedral Church of Canterbury, London, 1726.
 Westmonasterium; or the History and Antiquities of the Abbey Church of St. Peter's, Westminster, 2 vols. London, 1742.

Notes

Attribution

Year of birth missing
1730 deaths
English lawyers
18th-century English Anglican priests
English antiquarians